Tintner is a surname. Notable people with the surname include:

 Frederick Tintner (1912–2015), Czech-British soldier
 Georg Tintner (1917–1999), Austrian conductor
 Gerhard Tintner (1907–1983), American economist

See also
 Wintner